Portsmouth Water is the utility company responsible for water supply and distribution in the City of Portsmouth, part of East Hampshire and part of West Sussex. Places served include Gosport, Fareham, Portsmouth, Havant, Chichester, and Bognor Regis. The company is a private limited company with company number 2536455. It was acquired by Ancala in March 2018.

History 
Started on 13 July 1857 as the Borough of Portsmouth Waterworks Company to supply Portsmouth.

Joined with Gosport Waterworks Company in 1955.

A new headquarters in Havant was opened in September 1967.

On 3 June 2021, Havant Borough Council approved Portsmouth Water's plans for a reservoir at Havant Thicket.

Overview 
There are now 18 borehole sites throughout the catchment area from the South Downs groundwater and the natural springs in Havant and Bedhampton. There are up to 25 springs used at any one time producing up to 170 million litres per day.

References

Notes

Citations

Bibliography

External links 
 

Water companies of England
Companies based in West Sussex
Companies based in Portsmouth
1857 establishments in the United Kingdom